Rye Air Force Station (ADC ID: M-104) is a closed United States Air Force General Surveillance Radar station. It was closed in 1957.

History
Rye AFS was part of the planned deployment of 44 mobile radar stations by Air Defense Command in 1952 to provide protection for Strategic Air Command Bases (such as the nearby Pease Air Force Base) and to support the permanent deployment of the 75 stations of the ADC radar network around the perimeter of the country. This deployment had been projected to be operational by mid-1952. Funding, constant site changes, construction, and equipment delivery delayed deployment.

Constructed at the former Fort Dearborn coastal artillery site, the station became operational in 1956 when the 644th Aircraft Control and Warning Squadron activated an AN/TPS-1D radar at the site, and initially the station functioned as a Ground-Control Intercept (GCI) and warning station.  As a GCI station, the squadron's role was to guide interceptor aircraft toward unidentified intruders picked up on the unit's radar scopes.

It was soon closed due to a budget reduction in 1957. The site was re-equipped with an AN/FPS-14 and became an unmanned Gap Filler for North Truro AFS, Massachusetts, as site Fort Dearborn, P-10B. It was finally closed in June 1968.

Today, the site is the location of Odiorne Point State Park. Many former parts of Fort Dearborn remain. Rye AFS has been obliterated.

See also
 List of USAF Aerospace Defense Command General Surveillance Radar Stations

References

 Winkler, David F. (1997), Searching the skies: the legacy of the United States Cold War defense radar program. Prepared for United States Air Force Headquarters Air Combat Command.
 Information for Rye AFS, NH

External links
 Rye AFS and Fort Dearborn at NorthAmericanForts.com

Installations of the United States Air Force in New Hampshire
Radar stations of the United States Air Force
Aerospace Defense Command military installations
1956 establishments in New Hampshire
1957 disestablishments in New Hampshire
Military installations established in 1956
Military installations closed in 1957